Pero Niño (1378–1453) was a Castilian privateer at the service of Henry III the Sufferer active in the Mediterranean and the Atlantic during the first decade of the 15th century. He later served John II.

Biography 

He was born in 1378. He led a Mediterranean naval expedition in 1404–1405, getting to attack Tunis. Later in 1405–1406, he led an Atlantic campaign, raiding English settlements close to Bordeaux, Jersey, and Poole Harbour.
He took part in a military campaign against the Nasrid Kingdom of Granada, fighting for the then regent of Castile Ferdinand, brother of Henry III, in Ronda and Setenil.

He died on 17 January 1453.

El Victorial, a biographical chronicle on Pero Niño, was written by Gutierre Díaz de Games circa 1435–1448.

References

Bibliography 
 
 
 

Privateers
1378 births
1453 deaths